Vitolds Barkāns (born 8 May 1944) is a Soviet rower from Latvia. He competed at the 1968 Summer Olympics in Mexico City with the men's coxless four where they came eleventh.

References

1944 births
Living people
Soviet male rowers
Olympic rowers of the Soviet Union
Rowers at the 1968 Summer Olympics
Sportspeople from Riga